S.T.R.I.K.E., an acronym for Special Tactical Reserve for International Key Emergencies, is a fictional counter-terrorism and intelligence agency appearing in American comic books published by Marvel Comics. The organization often deals with superhuman threats, and was introduced in Captain Britain Weekly #17 as the United Kingdom's counterpart to the United States' anti-terrorism agency S.H.I.E.L.D.

This team appeared in the films Captain America: The Winter Soldier (2014) and Avengers: Endgame (2019). This version of the team were actually undercover Hydra agents. In various MCU film and television appearances, S.T.R.I.K.E. is a unit within S.H.I.E.L.D., not an independent organization.

Publication history
S.T.R.I.K.E. first appeared in Captain Britain Weekly #17 and was created by Gary Friedrich and Larry Lieber.

Bases of operation
S.T.R.I.K.E.'s original headquarters, as seen in the organization's first appearances, was an undersea air base which contained several of S.T.R.I.K.E.'s planes that were considered superior to their American counterparts at the time.

S.T.R.I.K.E.'s Psi division had their own headquarters.

Another headquarters was in a closed university, located in London, England; this headquarters was later used by D.U.C.K (Department of Unknown and Covert Knowledge).

Members
Like S.H.I.E.L.D., S.T.R.I.K.E. had hundreds of agents throughout several divisions.

Executive directors and deputy directors
 Tod Radcliffe - Director of S.T.R.I.K.E.
 Commander Lance Hunter - Second Director of S.T.R.I.K.E. Even after the organization's disbanding, Hunter is shown to have good ties with S.H.I.E.L.D. and W.H.O. when he is seen alongside Contessa Valentina Allegro de Fontaine, and with Alistaire Stuart briefing British superhumans on the details of the British Superhuman Registration Act. Also, Hunter is an ex-SAS soldier and ex-Mercenary.

Psi-division
 Elizabeth Braddock - Twin sister of Captain Britain. She later joins the X-Men as Psylocke and is a former member of the Exiles.
 Tom Lennox - A telepath and a telekinetic; he is Betsy Braddock's lover. During the Jasper's Warp saga, Lennox is gunned down by S.T.R.I.K.E.'s armored anti-superhuman "Beetle" squad.
 Alison Double - An albino telepath, clairvoyant, and aura reader. Now residing in Switzerland.
 Kevin Mulhearn - A telepath; he took an outside job as a mentalist using the name Doctor Destiny. He was performing his mind reading act at a theater in London, using his powers to tell what people had in their possession. He was killed by one of his volunteers from the audience who turned out to be Slaymaster, who had been charged with killing all of S.T.R.I.K.E.'s Psi-Division.
 Vicki Reppion - Killed by Slaymaster.
 Avril Davis - Killed by Slaymaster.
 Dennis Rush - Killed by Slaymaster.
 Andrew Hornby - Killed by Slaymaster.
 Leah Mickleson - Killed by Slaymaster.
 Stuart Hattrick - Killed by Slaymaster.

Sci-Tech division
 "Matthew" (codename) - Recruited telepath Betsy Braddock to join S.T.R.I.K.E.'s Psi-division. He later was recruited into R.C.X. as a regulator and given the new codename of Gabriel.

Other versions

Ultimate Marvel
S.T.R.I.K.E. in the Ultimate Marvel parallel universe was first introduced in Ultimate X-Men #15. Like its Marvel Universe counterpart, this version of S.T.R.I.K.E. is the British division of S.H.I.E.L.D. S.T.R.I.K.E. also has ties with S.H.I.E.L.D.'s sister organization in Europe, the European Defense Initiative.

Known members
 Colonel Elizabeth "Betsy" Braddock - a mutant telepath from the S.T.R.I.K.E. Psi-division who was possessed by Proteus and died in the ensuing conflict with the X-Men. Her consciousness came to reside in the body of a young comatose girl known as Kwannon. While inhabiting her new body Betsy was technically considered a minor and was thus unable to work for S.T.R.I.K.E. She worked undercover for Charles Xavier for a time, eventually joining the X-Men.
 Dai Thomas - a Welsh S.T.R.I.K.E. agent from Psi-division who was killed by Proteus. His Earth-616 counterpart was a police inspector who often clashed with S.T.R.I.K.E. and its descendant organizations.

In other media
 S.T.R.I.K.E. appears in media set in the Marvel Cinematic Universe. This version is S.H.I.E.L.D.'s counter-terrorism tactical unit, with Brock Rumlow and Jack Rollins as some of its known members, who are secretly aligned with Hydra as sleeper agents. They first appear in the live-action film Captain America: The Winter Soldier while alternate timeline versions of S.T.R.I.K.E. appear in the live-action film Avengers: Endgame and the animated Disney+ series What If...? episode "What If... the Watcher Broke His Oath?"
 S.T.R.I.K.E. agents appear as playable characters in Marvel Strike Force. This version of the organization's acronym stands for the Special Tactical Reserve for Interdimensional Key Events.

References

External links
 S.T.R.I.K.E. at Marvel.com
 S.T.R.I.K.E. at Marvel Wiki
 S.T.R.I.K.E. at Comic Vine
 

Characters created by Gary Friedrich
Characters created by Herb Trimpe
Characters created by Larry Lieber
Fictional British secret agents
Fictional organizations in Marvel Comics
Marvel UK teams